Matt Bennett (born November 13, 1991) is an American actor. He is known for playing the role of Robbie Shapiro in the Nickelodeon sitcom Victorious and for starring in the Will Ferrell-produced film The Virginity Hit.

Early life
Bennett grew up in Massapequa Park, New York. After appearing in numerous commercials, Bennett began his official acting career at the age of 18 as Jamie, in the 2009 TV movie Totally for Teens. He also appeared as Greg the Intern in the pilot episode of the Comedy Central sketch comedy series Michael & Michael Have Issues. According to several YouTube videos, Bennett is fluent in English and Japanese.

Career

2010–2013: The Virginity Hit, Victorious, and music career
Bennett starred in The Virginity Hit, released in October 2010. Described as a "documentary style comedy," Bennett stated in an interview that the film's "directors gave us cameras in our spare time, and he said do pranks, talk amongst yourselves, do things and film that. So we did, and most of the movie is what we filmed. So I feel like 20% is scripted but the rest is all real."

The Virginity Hit was produced by Funny or Die founders Will Ferrell and Adam McKay; in an interview with MTV News, Bennett stated that reception towards the film has been "very positive...I'm glad that people are getting that it's not just another teen sex romp. It's a film with heart and a bit of a soul and deep-down it’s a cool love story."

Bennett co-starred as Robbie Shapiro in the Nickelodeon sitcom Victorious. He was nominated for a 2011 Nickelodeon Kids' Choice Award (UK) in the category of "Nick UK's Funniest Person".

2013–present: Nerdist and continuing work
In March 2013, it was announced that Bennett would host a web series for the YouTube channel Nerdist. On the series, entitled "Nerdy Jobs", Bennett will go behind the scenes of many "Nerdy" jobs to show how interesting they are.

On June 23, 2014, Bennett was featured in the popular YouTube video "The Slap" as one of the participants. He was also asked to be the love interest for Ariana Grande's character in her "One Last Time" music video; she is his close friend and former co-worker from Victorious.

In 2015, Bennett guest-starred in the Game Shakers episode "Tiny Pickles", and appeared in the films Me and Earl and the Dying Girl and The Stanford Prison Experiment. In 2016, he had a role on the show Fresh Off the Boat.

On February 2, 2016, Bennett made a Snapchat press conference announcement about his debut studio album Terminal Cases. Bennett claims "it's a concept album about my parents' divorce where every song is inspired by different Robin Williams movies." It was released on June 10, 2016.

As of 2022, he toured as a DJ, playing songs from Disney and Nickelodeon series at several venues, including House of Blues chains. The shows were billed as "iParty with DJ Matt Bennett."

Filmography

Film

Television

Web

Music videos

Awards and nominations

References

External links

1991 births
Living people
21st-century American male actors
American male film actors
American male television actors
American male web series actors
Male actors from New York (state)
Massapequa High School alumni
People from Massapequa Park, New York